Alplus or A1+ is an independent Armenian media network. Until 2002, it had a TV channel which was closed by the government of Robert Kocharyan. Now it is present online at www.a1plus.am.

See also 

 Media in Armenia
 Television in Armenia

References

External links 

 

Television in Armenia
Free Media Awards winners